Auracher is a surname. Notable people with the surname include:

Patrick Auracher (born 1990), German footballer
Thomas Auracher (born 1969), German yacht racer